Samar is a kibbutz in the Arabah valley  in the far south of Israel. Located near Eilat, it falls under the jurisdiction of Hevel Eilot Regional Council.

History
The kibbutz was founded in 1976 by gar'in from other kibbutzim who wanted to form a different kind of community. The name "Samar" is borrowed from a plant that grows in the Arabah and near the Dead Sea.

Samar is one of the few kibbutzim that continues to maintain a lifestyle consistent with the original socialist ideals of the kibbutz movement.

Economy
Kibbutz Samar is primarily engaged in growing and exporting organic dates. Dates from Kibbutz Samar and other kibbutzim in the Ardom Co-op can be purchased in the United States at Mrs. Green's Natural Market.

Infrastructure
Most of Samar's electricity is set to be provided by a 30 m solar power tower that provided 100 kilowatts of electricity, as well as the kibbutz's heating needs. The tower was built by the company AORA, sits on 2 dunams (0.2 hectares), and includes 30 mirrors.

See also
Sands of Samar

References

External links
“Picking Up Organic Dates at Kibbutz Samar" video

Kibbutzim
Kibbutz Movement
Populated places established in 1976
Populated places in Southern District (Israel)
1976 establishments in Israel